is a passenger railway station  located in the city of Inzai, Chiba Prefecture Japan, operated by the East Japan Railway Company (JR East).

Lines
Kioroshi Station is served by the Abiko Branch Line of the Narita Line, and is located 14.0 kilometers from the terminus of the branch line at Abiko Station.

Layout
Kioroshi Station is an elevated station with dual opposed side platforms. The station building is built on a cantilever above and across the platform. The station has a Midori no Madoguchi staffed ticket office.

Platforms

History
Kioroshi Station was opened on April 1, 1901, as a station on the Narita Railway Company for both freight and passenger operations. On September 1, 1920, the Narita Railway was nationalised, becoming part of the Japanese Government Railway (JGR).  After World War II, the JGR became the Japan National Railways (JNR). Scheduled freight operations were suspended from October 1, 1974. The station was absorbed into the JR East network upon the privatization of the Japan National Railways (JNR) on April 1, 1987. The station building was rebuilt from 2007 to 2008.

Passenger statistics
In fiscal 2019, the station was used by an average of 2,059 passengers daily (boarding passengers only).

Surrounding area
 Inzai City Hall
Inzai General Hospital

See also
 List of railway stations in Japan

References

External links

 JR East station information 

Railway stations in Japan opened in 1901
Railway stations in Chiba Prefecture
Narita Line
Inzai